The Seurri were an ancient Gallaecian Celtic tribe, living in the center-east of modern Galicia, in the Sarria's county.

See also
Pre-Roman peoples of the Iberian Peninsula

External links
Detailed map of the Pre-Roman Peoples of Iberia (around 200 BC)

Tribes of Gallaecia
Galician Celtic tribes